San Bartolomeo Val Cavargna (Comasco:   or ) is a comune (municipality) in the Province of Como in the Italian region Lombardy, located about  north of Milan and about  north of Como.

San Bartolomeo Val Cavargna borders the following municipalities: Carlazzo, Cusino, Garzeno, San Nazzaro Val Cavargna.

Demographic evolution

References

Cities and towns in Lombardy